Horsfieldia samarensis is a species of plant in the family Myristicaceae. It is endemic to the Philippines.

References

Flora of the Philippines
samarensis
Vulnerable plants
Flora of the Visayas
Taxonomy articles created by Polbot

Critically endangered flora of Asia